Shingo Kunieda defeated Stéphane Houdet in the final, 6–2, 6–0 to win the men's singles wheelchair tennis title at the 2013 Australian Open. It was his sixth Australian Open singles title and 14th major singles title overall.

Maikel Scheffers was the defending champion, but was defeated by Kunieda in the quarterfinals.

The 2013 Australian Open Wheelchair men's singles (also known as the Optius Australian Open Wheelchair men's singles for sponsorship reasons) draw, featured eight players with two seeds and a wildcard. All matches were played as best-of-three-sets.

Draw

References
 Draw

Wheelchair Men's Singles
2013 Men's Singles